Martin Kerchev (born 22 October 1982) is a Bulgarian football midfielder who plays for Hebar Pazardzhik.Адаш ми е

International career
In 2002 Kerchev played once for Bulgaria national under-21 football team.

References

External links
 

1982 births
Living people
Bulgarian footballers
Association football midfielders
First Professional Football League (Bulgaria) players
PFC Spartak Varna players
PFC CSKA Sofia players
PFC Vidima-Rakovski Sevlievo players
PFC Slavia Sofia players
PFC Cherno More Varna players
PFC Lokomotiv Mezdra players
PFC Lokomotiv Plovdiv players
FC Dunav Ruse players
FC Hebar Pazardzhik players
Expatriate footballers in Albania
Bulgarian expatriates in Albania
Bulgarian expatriate sportspeople in Azerbaijan
People from Vratsa